Edward Lopez Pastor (June 28, 1943 – November 27, 2018) was an American politician who served as a member of the United States House of Representatives from Arizona from 1991 to 2015. A member of the Democratic Party, he represented Arizona's 2nd congressional district from 1991 to 2003, its 4th district from 2003 to 2013, and its 7th district from 2013 to 2015, all of which were anchored in downtown Phoenix.

Early life
Pastor was born in Claypool, Arizona, as the oldest of three children. After high school, he earned his Bachelor of Arts degree in chemistry from Arizona State University (ASU). He became a chemistry teacher at North High School in Phoenix and later went on to work as deputy director of the community service group Guadalupe Organization Inc.

After returning to ASU to earn a J.D. degree, he became an assistant to Arizona Governor Raúl Héctor Castro. In 1976, Pastor was elected to the Maricopa County Board of Supervisors, and he served three terms in that role as a county executive.

U.S. House of Representatives

Elections
In 1991, Pastor entered a special election to succeed retiring 28-year incumbent Democrat Mo Udall in the 2nd District, which then comprised the southwestern part of Arizona, including half of Tucson and portions of southern Phoenix.  Pastor won a narrow victory in the four-way Democratic primary, defeating his closest challenger, Tucson mayor Tom Volgy, by 1,800 votes. He was the only major candidate from the Phoenix share of the district.

He then won the special election a month later with 55 percent of the vote to become the first Latino to represent Arizona in Congress. He was reelected four times without substantive Republican opposition, never dropping below 60% of the vote.

Pastor's former territory was renumbered as the 7th District following the 2000 census, but his home in Phoenix was drawn into the newly created 4th District. Rather than move to the Phoenix portion of the reconfigured 7th, he opted to run in the 4th. The newly created district was heavily Democratic and majority-Latino, with Democrats having a nearly 2-to-1 advantage in registration, similar to his old district. He was reelected six times against nominal Republican opposition.

Tenure

Pastor was one of the nine Chief Deputy Whips for the Democratic Caucus. Following in Udall's footsteps, his voting record was decidedly liberal; for most of his tenure, he was the most liberal member of the Arizona congressional delegation. He was well-respected by members of both parties, and had a reputation for bipartisanship.

He was a founding member of the Congressional Progressive Caucus, was pro-choice, and in 2006 supported the interests of the Planned Parenthood 100 percent, according to their records. In 2006, NARAL Pro-Choice America-Endorsements endorsed Representative Pastor. He voted against the 2002 Iraq Resolution that started the Iraq War.

In 2011, Pastor voted against the National Right to Carry Reciprocity Act of 2011. He also voted against several bills that would encourage trade between countries such as Panama. Furthermore, he voted to encourage the display of "In God We Trust" in public buildings and schools.

In 2009-2010, Pastor was backed by the National Farmers Union. However, he was not supported by the National Council of Agricultural Employers.

Pastor was supported by the Defenders of Wildlife Action Fund, which works to protect native wildlife and wild areas.

Around the mid-1990s, Pastor was backed by the Americans for the Arts Action Fund. However, since then, their support has dwindled somewhat.

Pastor had a strong stance on civil rights regarding sexual orientation and race. For example, in 2007, he voted to prohibit job discrimination based on sexual orientation and, in 2006, he voted against defining marriage as one man-one woman. Finally, in 2004, he voted against a constitutional amendment that would ban same-sex marriage. In 2002, the ACLU rated Pastor at 93% for a pro-civil rights voting record.

In February 2014, Pastor announced that he would not seek reelection and would instead retire upon the completion of his term.

Committee assignments
Committee on Appropriations
Subcommittee of Energy and Water Development
Subcommittee on Financial Services and General Government
Subcommittee on Transportation, Housing and Urban Development, and Related Agencies (Ranking Member)
Source:

Caucuses
Congressional Progressive Caucus
Congressional Hispanic Caucus
International Conservation Caucus
Source:

Legacy

Multiple schools, parks and other institutions including the Ed Pastor Center for Politics and Public Service have been established in his honor. A section of Loop 202 in the Phoenix area was named in his honor.

Pastor has been credited with inspiring multiple generations of people dedicated to public service including Arizona State House Democratic Leader Charlene Fernandez.

Personal life

Pastor was married to Verma Mendez for 53 years and had two daughters, Yvonne and Laura. He died on November 27, 2018 following a heart attack in Phoenix at the age of 75.

Electoral history

Write-in and minor candidate notes: In 1990, write-ins received 44 votes. In 1992, write-ins received 5 votes.

See also

List of Hispanic and Latino Americans in the United States Congress

References

External links
 

 

|-

|-

|-

1943 births
2018 deaths
21st-century American politicians
American politicians of Mexican descent
Arizona lawyers
Arizona State University alumni
County supervisors in Arizona
Democratic Party members of the United States House of Representatives from Arizona
Schoolteachers from Arizona
Hispanic and Latino American members of the United States Congress
Hispanic and Latino American people in Arizona politics
People from Gila County, Arizona
Politicians from Phoenix, Arizona
20th-century American politicians
20th-century American educators
20th-century American lawyers